The Bahamas have competed at fourteen Commonwealth Games, missing only two, 1974 and 1986, since their initial appearance in 1954. Athletes from The Bahamas have won thirtyfour medals at the Games, with all but four coming in Athletics.

Medals

References

 
Nations at the Commonwealth Games